Marple Newtown School District (MNSD) is a public school district which serves Newtown Township and Marple Township in Delaware County, Pennsylvania. According to 2000 federal census data, it serves a resident population of 35,437. The student demographic is about 86% Caucasian, 11% Asian, 2% Black, and 1% Hispanic with 51% being male and 49% being female.

Schools
High School
 Marple Newtown Senior High School

Middle School
 Paxon Hollow Middle School

Elementary schools
 Culbertson Elementary School
 Loomis Elementary School
 Russell Elementary School
 Worrall Elementary School

Former schools:
 Alice Grim Elementary School - It was to close in June 1982

Extracurriculars
The district offers a wide variety of clubs, activities and an extensive sports program.

Visual and Performing Arts 
In 2019, Marple Newtown was named a "Best Community for Music Education" by the NAMM Foundation. It also received the award in 2013, 2014, 2015 and 2016.

The Marple Newtown High School Tiger Marching Band has won three Cavalcade of Bands open-class championships (2014, 2015 and 2016).

In 1975, the Tiger Marching Band performed on ice at the Spectrum with the Ice Capades.

Notable alumni 

 Marta Kauffman, co-creator of NBC sitcom Friends
 Mia Dillon, American actress
 Bruce Davison (1964), American actor and director
 Adrian Pasdar, American actor and voice artist
 Chris Wheeler, former announcer and color commentator for the Philadelphia Phillies
 Davis Miscavige, leader of the Church of Scientology
 Nicole Brewer, American news reporter and former Miss Pennsylvania
 Bill Maas, American football player
 Lynne Talley (1971), American oceanographer 
 Jeffrey Zaslow, American author and journalist
 Kevin J. Jacobsen, retired US Air Force Brigadier General
 Sarah Anderson, American curler
 George Schmitt, American football player
 Bob Speca Jr., world record holder for domino toppling
 Joel Johnston, Major League Baseball player
 James Fullington, Professional Wrestler

References

External links
 Official site
 District music site
 Delaware County Tech Schools career and technical education
 Delaware County Intermediate Unit #25

School districts in Delaware County, Pennsylvania
Broomall, Pennsylvania